Adil Taoui (born 10 August 2001) is a French professional footballer who plays as a forward.

Club career
Taoui made his professional debut in a 1–0 Ligue 1 loss to Strasbourg on 5 February 2020. On 14 July 2021, he signed for Ligue 2 club Bastia.

International career
Born in France, Taoui is of Algerian descent. He is a youth international for France.

References

External links
 
 
 

2001 births
Living people
Sportspeople from Limoges
French footballers
France youth international footballers
French sportspeople of Algerian descent
Association football forwards
Limoges FC players
Toulouse FC players
SC Bastia players
Ligue 1 players
Ligue 2 players
Championnat National 3 players
Footballers from Nouvelle-Aquitaine